The I Army Corps was a corps of the Royal Italian Army between 1877 and 1943.

History 
the I Army Corps was based in Turin and participated in World War I.
Between 1935 and 1937, it was part of the Italian Army that fought the Second Italo-Ethiopian War, which led to the Italian occupation of Ethiopia.

In June 1940, it took part in the Italian invasion of France. It reached  Bessans, Bramans, Modane, and Termignon in the Savoie. On 15 July it was sent back to Turin.
After the landings of the Allies in French North Africa, I Corps participated in Case Anton and on 11 November 1942, it entered French territory again. Starting from December, it took up coastal defense tasks between Cavater and Cape Martin. It remained here until September 1943, when it was disarmed by the Germans and dissolved after the Armistice of Cassibile.

Composition (1940-1943) 

1st Infantry Division "Superga" (1940-1941)
24th Infantry Division "Pinerolo" (1940)
59th Infantry Division "Cagliari" (1940)
223rd Coastal Division 
224th Coastal Division

Commanders 
 Ruggero Santini (1935.05 - 1936)
 Carlo Vecchiarelli (1940.04.09 – 1940.09.01)
 Curio Barbasetti di Prun (1940.09.01 – 1942.03.01)
 Federico Romero (1942.03.01 – 1943.09.08)

References 
 

Army corps of Italy in World War II